Narayanrao Bhat (10 August 1755 – 30 August 1773) was the 10th Peshwa of the Maratha Confederacy from November 1772 until his assassination in August 1773. He married Gangabai Sathe who later gave birth to Sawai Madhavrao.

Early life
Narayanrao Bhat was born 10 August 1755. He was the third and youngest son of Balaji Baji Rao (also known as Nana Saheb) and his wife Gopikabai. He received a conventional education in reading, writing and arithmetic and possessed a functional understanding of Sanskrit scriptures. He was married to Gangabai Sathe on 18 April 1763 before his eighth birthday. Gangabai was born in Kelashi village and belonged to Sathe family . Her father's name is not known, but Keshav Vinayak Sathe was the family head. Ruins of Gangabai's house are still present in Kelshi village near a small Datta Mandir. He was very close to Parvatibai, the widow of Sadashivrao, who took him under her care to lessen her sorrows after her husband's death. His eldest brother Vishwasrao, heir to the title of the Peshwa, died in the Battle of Panipat in 1761 along with Sadashivrao. His father died a few months later and his elder brother Madhavrao took over as Peshwa.

He accompanied his brother Madhavrao in his expeditions to Carnatic on two occasions, once in 1765 and later in 1769. He received a wound in his wrist at the storming of fort Nijagal at the end of April 1770. In last one or two years of his brother's reign, he was placed in the care of the Maratha minister Sakharam Bapu in order to train him in his administrative work. His behaviour and performance of his duties always failed to impress his brother Madhavrao who expressed great fears about his future.

Ascension 
Before his death, Madhavrao conducted a court session in which the issue of ascension was discussed at length and at the end of which, in the presence of the family deity, he nominated his younger brother Narayanrao as the next Peshwa. He counselled Naraynrao to conduct his administration by the advice of Sakharam Bapu and Nana Padnavis. Raghunathrao, the uncle of both Madhavrao and Narayanrao, didn't have the courage to openly oppose the nomination of Narayanrao in front of the dying Peshwa and so he apparently acquiesced to the arrangement. The Peshwa had also ordered in writing that Raghunathrao was to continue his confinement so as to prevent him from engaging in mischief. Raghunathrao attempted an escape shortly before the Peshwa's death but was immediately caught and put back into confinement.

Madhavrao finally died on 18 November 1772. His funeral rites were conducted at Theur and the court returned to Pune on 2 December. Narayanrao prepared to set off for Satara in order to receive his robes from Rajaram II. Before he could leave, his uncle Raghunathrao demanded to accompany him to Satara unless he was granted an independent fief of 25 lakhs annually for him and his family. But Raghunathrao was persuaded to give up his demands. And so Narayanrao went to Satara and received his robes from Rajaram II on 13 December. At the same time, Sakharam Bapu took his role as Karbhari ("Chief Administrator") and other officials confirmed their respective posts.

Reign

Alienation of various groups

Gardis 
The Peshwas employed Gardi soldiers for police duty around the palace and the city of Pune. The Gardis were less than 5000 strong and were mostly composed of North Indians, Pathans, Ethiopians, Arabs, Rajputs and Purbiyas. Their monthly salary ranged somewhere between Rs. 8 and Rs. 15. According to French military leader and administrator Marquis de Bussy-Castelnau, the Gardis saw their role in purely commercial terms and had no personal attachment to their employer. The new Narayanrao inherited an empty treasury from his brother. Madhavrao had lost all the wealth he had accumulated over the years in paying off the empire's debts and had failed to bring funds in the last few years of life due to his illness. On top of that, with Ibrahim Khan Gardi and Marquis de Bussy gone, the Gardis no longer had an overarching leader to keep them disciplined. The unpaid and disorganised Gardis had now become a liability for the Marathas but neither Peshwa nor his advisors paid much attention to the pressing issue.

Prabhus 

The Prabhus were an influential community in the Maratha empire. They claimed to be belonging to the Kshatriya ("warrior") caste which gave them the right to perform religious functions through the use of Vedic chants. A dispute over their caste status had occurred in the late 17th century but it was virtually resolved after the founder of the Maratha empire Shivaji and his confidential secretary Balaji Avji Chitnis, a Prabhus by caste, performed the sacred thread ceremony of their sons at the same time by using Vedic chants under the direction of the celebrated Brahmin scholar Gaga Bhatt. This created a precedent that allowed the Prabhus to hold on to their Kshatriya status without interference from orthodox Brahmins. But then Narayanrao decided to take up the cause of the orthodoxy and, likely under the impression from Nana Phadnavis, reduced their caste status from that of Kshatriya ("warrior") to that of Shudra ("servant"). Prominent leaders of the Prabhu community were called together and under severe torture, including starvation, forced to give up their caste status. They were compelled to sign an agreement of nine specific articles, according to which they would give up Kshatriya status and accept Shudra status. This action on the part of Narayanrao lost him the support of an influential community who later supported Raghunathrao.

Sakharam Bapu 
Sakharam Bapu's policy which favoured compromise over radicalism was at odds with the rash and irritable behaviour of Narayanrao. The differences between the two quickly came to light during the appointment of the governorship of Vasai. The position had previously been held for a long time by a soldier and diplomat named Visajipant Lele. Sakharam Bapu held him in high regard because he had faithfully served him in several awkward situations that required mutual support. But Visajipant Lele was a corrupt official whose ill deeds were long known to Madhavrao. During the last days of his tenure, Madhavrao dismissed Visajipanth Lele after he misappropriated government property worth 20 lakhs. So when Narayanrao became Peshwa, Visajipanth Lele requested the new Peshwa to reappoint him as the Governor of Vasai. His request was supported by Sakharam Bapu but Narayanrao rejected Bapu's advise and appointed Trimbak Vinayak instead.

Narayanrao and Sakharam Bapu also disagreed on the issue of the Patwardhan Sardars. The Patwardhan Sardars had gained enormous power through their loyal service to the late Peshwa which irked Sakharam Bapu and Raghunathrao who took certain steps to lower their prestige, much to the displeasure of Narayanrao. Since the differences between Narayanrao and Sakharam Bapu were growing they decide to consult the opinions of Gopikabai, the widow of Balaji Rao and the eldest member of the family. And so Narayanrao, Sakharam Bapu and Vamanrao Patwardhan, the leading of the Patwardhan family, repaired to Gangapur in the middle of March 1773 to meet ask for her advise. They spent a few days in frank discussion but couldn't arrive at any definite resolution.

Other Maratha officials 

The courtiers at Pune had very negative opinions of the new Peshwa whom they described as impatient, irritable, facetious, gullible and immature person who refused to follow the guidance of Sakharam Bapu. Narayanrao had started imitating the manners and behaviour of his elder brother Madhavrao and had openly disrespected Sakharam Bapu and other elderly officials on several occasions. Nana Phadnavis kept himself aloof due to lack of confidence shown towards him. Unlike his senior colleague Sakharam Bapu, he only involved himself with the administration when absolutely necessary. This explains why Nana Phadnavis did not notice the talks of intrigues and plots taking place in the city. Moroba Phadnavis was another member of the executive government who shared the attitutde of indifference towards the Peshwa. The same was true for the Maratha general Haripant Phadke.

Confinement of Raghunathrao

First attempt to escape 
Narayanrao's relationship with his uncle Raghunathrao was cordial at the beginning. When Raghunathrao's daughter Durgabai was about to get married, Narayanrao made the arrangements for the marriage which took place on 7 February 1773. But later when Narayanrao was at Nashik, Raghunathrao tried to take advantage of the Peshwa's absence and plotted his escape. Raghunathrao began to enlist his own troops and wrote to Haidar Ali for support. Naro Appaji, the Maratha officer incharge for law and order in Pune, heightened the security around Raghunathrao by placing guards to watch all the exits of the palace and the city. Raghunathrao pitched his tents outside and declared that he was going on an expedition.

As soon as this news reached Narayanrao he returned to Pune and found Raghunathrao in his tents. He brought him back to the palace on 11 April 1773 and placed additional guards to prevent his escape. This further strained the relationship between Narayanrao and Raghunathrao. In July 1773, Raghunathrao become so exasperated with the restrictions imposed on him that he threatened to starve himself, his wife and his adopted son to death. Narayanrao failed to sooth things over by compromise. He had no advisors whom he could trust upon at this point.

Second attempt to escape 
Two agents from Nagpur had been dispatched to Pune to request the Peshwa's confirmation for making Raghuji Bhonsle, the son of Mudhoji Bhonsle, the ruler of Nagpur in order to put the succession dispute between Mudhoji and his brother Sabaji to an end. But when the two agents arrived at Pune in the summer of 1773 and discovered the tensions between Narayanrao and Raghunathrao, they realised they had much to benefit from the chaos. At the same time Narayanrao continued supporting the claim of Sabaji and sent armed reinforcements under Khanderao Darekar to support him against his brother. This caught the ire of Mudhoji who vaguely told his agents to do whatever they deemed necessary for accomplishing their mission by supporting Raghunathrao's power.

But the agents needed to have a discussion with Raghunathrao before they could formulate a plan. Raghunathrao was in strict confinement at the time and so they approached Sakharam Hari Gupte, a strong partisan of Raghunathrao who had also been incensed by the Peshwa's decision to reduce the caste status of his community. They manage to obtain a secret meeting with Raghunathrao in which they hatch a plan which involved seizing Narayanrao and placing Raghunathrao on the throne. This would require for Raghunathrao to be free and organise an armed foce. In August 1773, during night time, Raghunathrao tried to escape using the help of Lakshman Kashi. But Raghunathrao was caught and taken into custody while Lakshman Kashi managed to escape and fled from Pune.

When news of Raghunathrao's attempted escape reached Narayanrao he made the terms of uncle's confinement harsher. Raghunathrao was no longer allowed to leave his room, all his essentials were delivered to him and his lavish lifestyle was curtailed. As part of his prayer, Raghunathrao would stand in the open and gaze at the sun, but he was now barred from performing it which made him furious. Although the relationship between Madhavrao and Raghunathrao, the former carefully avoided exasperating his uncle beyond a certain limit and skillfully employed his uncle's partisans so as to prevent any action against him. But Narayanrao lacked his elder brother's foresight and so his dissidents were able to find a common goal in supporting his uncle.

Third attempt to escape 
Raghunathrao was also able to find the finding the sympathy of Appaji Ram, the ambassador of Haidar Ali at Pune, who managed to persuade his ruler to support Raghunathrao's cause. When Narayan found out about his uncle's plan to escape by enlisting the support Haidar Ali, he confined him in his palace and allowed neither his friends to visit him nor his servants to attend to him. His uncle, whether through exasperation or shrewdness, declared that he would starve himself to death so that his murder would be attributed to his nephew. For the next eighteen days, he consumed nothing except for two ounces of deer milk each day. When he was finally exhausted due to pangs of hunger, his nephew somewhat relented by promising him a district and five castles and a jagir of Rs. 12 lakh per annum, provided some of the great chieftains would become surety for his future conduct.

Foreign Policy

Resettlement of old allies 
The Marathas led by Mahadji Shinde had recaptured Delhi in 1771. Mahadji Shinde and other Marathas chiefs were later occupied in looking after the affairs of Delhi and collecting revenues from other North Indian districts. Ghazi-uddin Imad-ul-mulk, an ally of the Marathas, was anxious to be reinstalled as the Wazir of the Mughal Empire as he had once been. The Mughal emperor Shah Alam II bitterly hated Ghazi-uddin for he murdering his father and would not give him any help. Meanwhile, Ghazi-uddin had been reduced to the status of a vagabond and so he went to Pune in December 1772 to make his case in front of the new Peshwa. In recognition of the services he had rendered onto the Marathas so far, and likely because of a promise made to him by Narayanrao, Nana Padnavis gave Ghazi-uddin a small provision in Bundelkhand. The previous Nawab of Bengal Mir Qasim was another important friend of the Marathas and expected  a similar compensation for his services but it was beyond the power of the Peshwa to satisfy him.

British naval attack 

In April 1772, as Madhavrao was on his death bed, the President of Bombay Council received orders from the Home authorities to try and acquire from the Maratha certain places such as Salsette, Vasai, Elephanta, Karanja and others islands in the vicinity of Mumbai and to station a British agent in Pune in order to gain that object. British official Thomas Mostyn was chosen for the task as he was already familiar with the Pune court, having led the British mission of 1767.  He arrived in Pune on 13 October 1772 and spent the next two years keenly watching the events unfold and advising the Bombay Council to take the necessary steps for the acquisition of those place.

Soon after the death of Madhavrao and ascension to the Maratha throne of his ostensibly weaker brother Narayanrao, the British navy sensing an opportunity started wanton aggression against Maratha posts of Thane, Vasai, Vijaydurg and Ratnagiri on the west coast. But Narayanrao took immediate action by appointing Trimbak Vinayak as the Sar-Subah of Vasai and the Konkan, and dispatched him with necessary funds to counter the British efforts. Trimbak Vinayak and the Maratha naval officer Dhulap of Vijaydurg together successfully repelled the British attack. But Mostyn remained at Pune watching and waiting for another opportunity.

Nagpur succession crisis 
The death of the ruler of Nagpur Janoji Bhonsle in May 1772 set off a succession dispute within his family and led to a civil war between his sons Mudhoji and Sabaji. The disputed created ruptures at the Court of Pune as Sakharam Bapu and Raghunathrao supported Mudhoji while Narayanrao, Nana Phadnavis and others supported Sabaji. Sabaji also gained the support of Nizam Ali Khan and fought some battles against him brother whose result turned out to be indecisive. The brothers finally reached an agreement, according to which Mudhoji's son Raghuji was to be made the ruler of Nagpur. The arrangement had to be approved by the Peshwa, and so two agents, Vyankatrao Kashi Gupte and his brother Lakshman, were sent to Pune in order to acquire the robes for Raghuji.

The agents sent to Pune belonged to the Prabhu caste whose members were cross with Narayanrao who, likely under the impression from Nana Phadnavis, had reduced their caste status from that of Kshatriya ("warrior") to that of Shudra ("servant"). Prominent leaders of the Prabhu community were called together and under severe torture, including starvation, forced to give up their caste status. This action on the part of Narayanrao lost him the support of an influential community who later supported Raghunathrao. The two agents then tried to help Raghunathrao escape from his confinement. The actions of the agents exasperated and disgusted the Peshwa who on 16 August 1773 issued orders recognising Sabaji as the rightful ruler of Nagpur and commanded the agents to go back to Nagpur along with the third agent Bhavani Shivam who had just arrived.

Assassination

The period between 16 and 30 August witnessed an unprecedented number of secret talks and concealed discussions taking place among the various partisans of Raghunathrao, but as this had been a regular occurrence at the palace, no responsible official paid any serious attention to them. Since Raghunathrao could not leave his confinement, the preparations for the plot were carried out by Tujali Pawar, an influential personal servant of Raghunathrao and his wife Anandibai. Tujali additionally felt he had been wronged by Narayanrao and possibly Madhavrao, and regardless of whether this supposed offense was real or not, it motivated him to play an integral part in the plot. While the previous plan involved simply capturing Narayanrao, the new plan involved his murder and was partly based on the assumption that Sakharam Bapu would remain neutral with regards to the plot.

Legal consequences 
Ram Shastri, the Nyayadhish ("Chief Justice") of the Maratha empire, likely began looking into the killing of Narayanrao immediately after the incident despite Raghunathrao's opposition. The investigation lasted for around six weeks and decisions were made in accordance with established judicial practices. Shastri found Raghunathrao as the main culprit and in addition about fifty persons more or less responsible for the murder (forty nine males and one female servant). Of these forty nine men, thirteen were Gardis (eight Hindus and five Muslims), twenty six were Brahmin, three were Prabhu and seven were Marathas. The twenty six Brahmins were essentially clerks who acted as agents in planning and executing the details of the plan. Vyankatrao Kashi, his brother Laxman and Sakharam Hari Gupte were the three Prabhus who were declared to have played a prominent role in the plot. When Shastri approached Raghunathrao, the latter downplayed the murder as a private, personal affair and asked the former to not concern himself with it. Shastri on his part, without an ounce of fear, told Raghunathrao that he was the main culprit for the murder of his nephew. Hence Raghunathrao and the general public understood the degree of power that lay with the judiciary in a well-governmed state. But Shastri was dismissed from his office by Raghunathrao and went back to his native village.

Barbhais Council 
While Shastri was conducting his investigation, Sakharam Bapu ensured that pregnant Gangabai, the widow of Narayanrao, was secure and safe from harm's way. If Gangabai were to give birth to a male child, he would become the heir to the kingdom. But if she were to give birth to a female child, Sakharam Bapu contemplated the idea of making Ali Bahadur, the grandson of Baji Rao, the Peshwa of the Maratha empire. He convinced most of the Maratha chiefs from Raghunathrao's camp to switch sides without rousing his suspicion. He laid the foundations of a group of twelve Maratha officials and chiefs who were collectively known as the Barbhais Council ("Twelve Comrades"). These included Nana Phadnavis, Haripant Phadnavis, Babuji Naik, Maloji Ghorpade, Bhavanrao Pratinidhi, Raste, Patwardhans with the addition of Mahadji Shinde and Tukoji Holkar.

Raghunathrao's short lived government 

Having failed to convince the senior and most highly competent ministers such as Sakharam Bapu and Nana Phadnavis to join his new administration, Raghunathrao had to begin his rule with the help of ministers Chinto Vithal and Moroba Phadnavis. The two Nagpur agents also continued supporting him. Raghunathrao sent one of them, Laksham Kashi with a letter of friendly terms to Mudhoji Bhonsle inviting him to Pune with all his forces. The other Nagpur agent Vyankatrao remained in Pune to help the new Peshwa manage the new administration. He sent Amritrao to Satara to procure the robes from Chhatrapati Rajaram II but there was a delay and the robes were finally obtained on 10 October 1773. He did not ceremoniously accept them in a durbar at Pune but rather at Alegaon near the river Bhima on the last day of October. He prepared his own seal and purposefully omitted Rajaram's name as being inauspicious.

During the Dashera festival occurring on the 25th of September 1773, apart from having to discuss the threats posed by Haidar Ali and Nizam Ali, Raghunathrao also had to deal with the Gardi chiefs who virtually held all the power and whose only goal was to get as much money from him as possible. He appointed Bhavanrao Pratinidhi as his agent for settling the matter with the Gardi chiefs. Bhavanrao Pratinidhi got rid of the Gardi chiefs from the palace by paying them the stipulated five lakh rupees and an additional amount of three lakh rupees in lieu of the three forts they wanted as their safe resort. During the negotiations, the Gardis had threatened to depose Raghunathrao and install Ali Bahadur (grandson of Peshwa Baji Rao) as the peshwa if their payments were made. They also demanded and were given a written order that Raghunathrao would protect them under all circumstances.

Hence Raghunathrao now had no strong supporters except second rate men such as the Gardi chiefs, and Sakharam Hari, Sadashiv Ramchandra, Vyankatrao Kashi, Abaji Mahadev, Tulaji Pawar, Moroba Phadnavis, Maloji Ghorpade, Govindrao Gaikwad, Manaji Phadke and Mudhoji Bhonsle. Gangadhar Yeshwant, an important partisan of Raghunathrao, died on 20 February 1774 and this considerably weakened his party. But at least his monetary troubles were relieved after Visaji Krishna arrived in Pune and brought with him, under orders from the previous Peshwa, a treasure of 22 lakh rupees and which Raghunathrao greedily sized.

Legacy 
The Narayan Peth area in Pune is named after Peshwa Narayanrao.
There is a belief in Pune that Narayanrao's  ghost roams the ruins of Shaniwar Wada  at every full moon night and calls out for help just like the way he did on the fateful day of his assassination . Bajirao II believed in the ghost superstition too and planted thousands of mango trees around Pune city and gave donations to Brahmins and religious institutions in the hope that this would propitiate the ghost.
S. N. Patankar directed an early Indian silent film on the assassination of the Peshwa, titled Death of Narayanrao Peshwa, in 1915.

References

1755 births
1773 deaths
Narayan Rao
People of the Maratha Empire
Marathi people
18th-century Indian monarchs
Indian Hindus